Diaethria pandama is a species of butterfly of the genus Diaethria. It was described by Edward Doubleday in 1848. It is found from Mexico to Panama.

The larvae feed on Serjania species.

References

Biblidinae
Butterflies described in 1848